The 2010–11 season of Hannover 96 began on 26 June with their first friendly match.

Squad

Transfers

Summer

In:

Out:

Winter

In:

Out:

Season results

Bundesliga

League table

Matches

DFB-Pokal

Statistics

Appearances and goals

|}

Goalscorers

Clean sheets

Disciplinary record

References

Hannover 96 seasons
Hannover 96 season 2010-11